Valentin Sergeyevich Prilepin (born 23 November 1999) is a Russian football player.

Club career
He made his debut in the Russian Professional Football League for FC Orenburg-2 on 10 April 2018 in a game against FC Zenit-Izhevsk. He made his debut for the senior squad of FC Orenburg on 25 September 2018 in a Russian Cup game against FC Dynamo Barnaul.

References

External links
 
 

1999 births
Living people
Russian footballers
FC Orenburg players
FC Tambov players
Association football defenders
Association football midfielders
FC Volga Ulyanovsk players